The 2004–05 St. Lawrence Saints women's hockey team represented St. Lawrence University in the 2004–05 NCAA Division I women's hockey season. The Saints were coached by Paul Flanagan and play their home games at Appleton Arena. The Saints were a member of the Eastern College Athletic Conference and were unable to win the NCAA Women's Ice Hockey Championship

Regular season

Schedule

Player stats

Frozen Four

* Overtime

*** 3rd Overtime

St Lawrence defeated Dartmouth 5-1 in the Consolation Game.

Awards and honors
Rebecca Russell, Senior Athlete of the Year
Rebecca Russell, All-America selection

See also
St. Lawrence Saints women's ice hockey

References

Saint Lawrence
NCAA women's ice hockey Frozen Four seasons
St. Lawrence Saints women's ice hockey seasons